Colin Booth (9 December 1924, Scissett, West Yorkshire, UK – 9 April 2003, Somerset, Southwest England) was an English mycologist, known a leading authority on the genus Fusarium.

Biography
As the son of a beamer in a textile mill, Colin Booth grew up in the village of Scissett and was educated at the village school. He left school at age 14, first working as a stone mason and then as a butcher. During WW II in 1941 he volunteered for the Royal Navy and served until 1943 when a spinal injury caused him to be invalided out. After two years of study, he graduated from Huddersfield Technical College. At the University of London, he graduated with a B.Sc. in botany, an M.Sc. in mycology and plant pathology in 1953, and a Ph.D. in 1959 with a Ph.D. thesis on Fusarium.

From 1969 to 1983, Booth was assistant director of Kew's International Mycological Institute (IMI). There he produced comprehensive maps of the global distribution of plant diseases. His research on classification of microfungi provided a conceptual framework for research by plant pathologists. The work of William Laurence Gordon (1901–1963) had a major influence on Booth.

Booth's research is important not only for crop production but also in medicine. Cyclosporin A (CS-A), a hendecapeptide isolated from the fungi Cylindrocarpon lucidum Booth and Trichoderma polysporum, is a potent immunosuppressive drug that proved valuable for preventing rejection of kidney transplants. 

Booth's highly-cited book The genus Fusarium (1971) is acknowledged as a comprehensive, valuable reference and the standard text on this important genus, in which many of the species are plant pathogens. In this 1971 book, he accepted only 50 specific taxonomic names out of more than 1000 proposed names in the genus Fusarium. He lectured in North America, the Middle East and India. He was the president of the British Mycological Society for a one-year term from 1977 to 1978.

Booth married his wife Dorothy in 1950. In retirement they lived in Batcombe, Somerset. Upon his death in 2003, he was survived by his widow and their son and daughter.

Selected publications

Articles

Books and pamphlets
 
     
 
 
 
  (Booth contributed 2 chapters.)
 Chapter I Introduction to General Methods (summary) Chapter II Fungal Culture Media (summary)

References

1924 births
2003 deaths
English mycologists
Phytopathologists
Alumni of the University of London
People from Scissett